The American Home is registered with the Russian government as a "non-commercial educational institution." It provides instruction in both English and Russian and facilitates intercultural exchanges. The home's design reflects a typical American suburban home. Its main focus is its EFL program which now serves more than 500 Russian students during its fall and spring terms and more than 100 students during its 6-week intensive summer program.

History 

The home was built in 1992 by Serendipity: Russian Consulting & Development,  LTD - now doing business as Serendipity-Russia - to foster relations between the United States and Russia after the collapse of the Soviet Union. Dr. Ron Pope, a political science professor at Illinois State University specializing in Russian politics (now retired), organized the project to showcase American construction materials and home building techniques, with the intent of fostering investment and trade opportunities. Vladimir was selected by Dr. Pope because of its relationship to Bloomington-Normal, one of Vladimir's sister cities. Materials were donated by more than 50 North American companies and volunteer labor was provided by 25 primarily central Illinois builders and Illinois State University Industrial Technology students. The energy efficient house was designed and its construction was supervised by Illinois State University Industrial Technology professor, Dr. Ed Francis.  Dr. Pope's father, Russell Pope, provided the more than $125,000 that was needed to cover expenses such as shipping (usable building materials were not available at that time in Russia). Construction began May 18, 1992 and the house was dedicated that July 4, much to the pleasant surprise of the Russians who were used to even relatively small projects taking much longer to complete.  The house includes three bedrooms, one full and two half bathrooms, a two-car garage (subsequently largely converted to a waiting area for students and visitors), and a typical American yard with a lawn and flower beds.

After construction the aims of the project changed, and the major goal of the American Home became the facilitating of intercultural communication through its language programs and educational exchanges.  An effort was also made to promote community development in Vladimir and the surrounding area, with a special emphasis on tourism development.].

In January 2016 all of the organizations offices and classes were moved to leased space in a new building located at 5 Fedoseyeva St., and the Vladimir City Administration took over ownership of the original American Home. For an explanation for the change in  ownership of the American Home, see A Brief History of "The American Home"  Also see the PowerPoint tour of the new facility.

Dr. Ron Pope, founder and president of Serendipity, oversees the organization from Bloomington-Normal, Illinois. The American Home's Russian Executive Director is Galya Altonen. Her husband, Alexei Altonen, is in charge of "special projects."  They are very ably assisted by the excellent Russian staff, most of whom have been working at the Home for ten or more years, along with the largely young Americans who spend at least a year teaching in the English program. On the American side, in addition to Dr. Pope, former American Home teachers David Johnson, Jane Keeler, and Brooke Ricker are playing important roles.  David, an Instructor of Russian at Vanterbilt University, is concentrating on the development of the Home's Intensive Russian program, an Alternative Spring Break program, and a Writing Exchange; Jane Keeler is the webmaster; and Brooke Ricker assists with the English program. Brooke is currently enrolled in the PhD program in applied linguistics at Penn State and Jane has completed a Masters in ESL and is now teaching at the University of Florida.

English School 

The English program at the American Home provides EFL [English as a Foreign  Language] lessons for Russians. Students range in age from 7 to 60+ and come from a variety of backgrounds.(In fall 2015 classes were added for children 7 to 11 years old.) Classes for the older students are taught at 11 levels from beginning through advanced. Instruction is provided by 9 Americans and 4 experienced Russians (who teach the young children's classes and the very beginning level for the older students). Each regular class meets twice a week for an hour and a half in the evening. (The young children meet for one hour twice a week in the afternoon and early evening.) Two discussion classes meet once a week during the fall and spring terms. The six-week summer school classes meet for 2.25 hrs. three times a week. On Saturdays, the teachers present American culture through movies, lectures, and activities such as game nights and holiday celebrations.

American Home Programs 

For more information on all of its activities, including the Writing Exchange between Russian students of English and American students of Russian, the Alternative Spring Break program, and the sponsorship of street ball tournaments, see: http://www.serendipity-russia.com.

References

External links 
 Serendipity-Russia

https://www.facebook.com/AmericanHome

Buildings and structures in Vladimir Oblast
Education in Russia
Russia–United States relations